Zhang Bojun (November 17, 1895 – May 17, 1969) was a Chinese politician and intellectual, and was removed from his ministerial position in the late 1950s after being declared "China's number one rightist."

Biography
Zhang graduated from the Anhui Province Tongcheng Secondary School and in 1916 completed the test to enter the Wuhan Advanced Normal School (what is now Wuhan University). In 1920 he became an English teacher at the Anhui Fourth Normal School (Anhui Xuancheng Middle School today), where he taught for a year.

In 1922 Zhang traveled to Germany—on the same boat as Zhu De—to study philosophy for the next four years. This trip was due to the support of Xu Shiying, a high-ranking Nationalist politician who held Zhang in high regard. After arriving in Germany, Zhang joined the Communist Party of China (CPC) after becoming friends with Zhu De (Field Marshal and Supreme Military Commander of the New China), his roommate at the time.  Zhang left the CPC following the doom of the “August First” military uprising at Nanchang in 1927, and over the years, in collaboration with others, founded the so-called "third parties", known today as the Chinese Democratic Party of Peasants and Workers, and the China Democratic League. Before his revolutionary career, Zhang was the dean of No.4 Normal School (Xuancheng High School) in his home province of Anhui (where he had taught at the beginning of his career), and later an English professor in Sun Yat-sen University in Guangzhou, Guangdong Province.

He was appointed Vice-Chairman of the 2nd CPPCC, National Committee of the People’s Republic of China (1954–1959), and minister in charge of transportation. Vocal during the Hundred Flowers Campaign, Zhang was removed by Mao Zedong from his minister's position and made a public enemy during the Anti-Rightist Campaign in 1957, being labeled "China’s number one rightist".

His 10,000-volume family library was destroyed during the Cultural Revolution in the 1960s. His daughter Zhang Yihe is a writer whose history books have been censored.  Even several years after his death, Chinese communists still criticised him and defended the CPC’s actions.

With his political ambitions unfulfilled and reform goals unaccomplished, Zhang lived a Renaissance man’s life in his private library of ancient books and art relics after his removal from the many positions he once held.  At least until the Cultural Revolution, he could retreat to this last sanctuary to reflect back on his journey from an early member of the CPC and a leader in the “August First” military uprising (1927), to a high-level power broker between the CPC and third-party political forces (late 1940s), and on to an enthusiast of the New China.  He was once made an offer by the central government to live in exile abroad with state funding, but Zhang rejected the offer, and said, “Please convey to Chairman Mao, Zhang Bojun was born on this land, and he will die on this land”, as quoted in his daughter’s best seller of 2004 as well as unofficial biographies of friends and associates of Zhang and his family.  Also quoted in his daughter’s best seller was Zhang’s own personal motto: “I do not judge myself by the honors I hold or by the indignities forced upon me, nor do I judge others by their successes and failures in life.”  Taking great personal pride in his contributions to the founding of the People's Republic, Zhang rose early on October 1 of every year to prepare for the celebration of the new republic's birthday, dressing up very meticulously for the occasion.  He kept up this practice even after he was stripped of all of his titles.

Zhang died of stomach cancer and the family believed that depression as a result of his political downfall may have contributed to the deterioration of his health.

To his consolation in a poetic sense, in the TV docu-drama series The Liberation, made in China to commemorate the 60th anniversary of the founding of the People's Republic, Zhang was portrayed fairly accurately in his activities as a power-broker in the late 1940s, though overall the role in the TV docu-drama was minor.

References

1895 births
1969 deaths
Deaths from stomach cancer
People's Republic of China politicians from Anhui
People from Tongcheng, Anhui
Writers from Anhui
Academic staff of Sun Yat-sen University
Educators from Anhui
Victims of the Cultural Revolution
Humboldt University of Berlin alumni
Ministers of Transport of the People's Republic of China
Chinese Communist Party politicians from Anhui
Chinese Peasants' and Workers' Democratic Party politicians
Members of the China Democratic League
Guangming Daily people
Victims of the Anti-Rightist Campaign
Politicians from Anqing
Deaths from cancer in the People's Republic of China
Members of the Standing Committee of the 3rd Chinese People's Political Consultative Conference
Members of the 4th Chinese People's Political Consultative Conference
Vice Chairpersons of the National Committee of the Chinese People's Political Consultative Conference